The Egyptian Centre for Women's Rights (ECWR) is a civil, independent, non-governmental, non-partisan, not-for-profit organization in Egypt. It supports Egyptian woman in obtaining full rights and equality with men. In addition, the ECWR motivates legislative authorities to review legislation related to women's rights, not only as it relates to the Egyptian Constitution, but international agreements as well. The ECWR consolidates both civil and political women's rights, and offers legal services to women who can not afford to pay for them. Nihad Abu El-Qoumsan heads the organization.

According to a survey issued by the ECWR in 2008, 83 percent of Egyptian women and 98 percent of foreign women within Egypt had experienced sexual harassment at some time.  Of those who reported cases of sexual harassment to ECWR, only 12 percent had gone to the police with a complaint. Considering sexual harassment to be a social 'cancer', the ECWR asked the government to introduce legislation to curb it.

See also

 678 (film)
 Feminism in Egypt
 Gender inequality in Egypt
 HARASSmap
 Judiciary of Egypt
 Mass sexual assault in Egypt
 Operation Anti Sexual Harassment
 Rape in Egypt
 Women in Egypt

References

External links
 Official website

Women's organisations based in Egypt
Women's rights in Egypt